The Yersin Museum is a museum in Nha Trang, Vietnam. It is dedicated to Alexandre Yersin, the French-Swiss bacteriologist.

It is located on 8 - 10 Tran Phu Boulevard in the former home of Yersin and in the enclosure of the Pasteur Institute.

The museum contains a large collection of Yersin's research equipments and letters as well as provides a description of his contributions to bacteriology, medicine, and science. The captions are in French with accompanied English and Vietnamese translations .
It is open from 8am until 11am and 2pm until 4:30pm weekdays and closed on Saturdays and Sundays. Entry fee is VND 26,000 for adults.

References

 Bảo tàng Dr. A.Yersin

Nha Trang
Museums in Vietnam
Buildings and structures in Khánh Hòa province
Tourist attractions in Khánh Hòa province
Science museums
Year of establishment missing